Orion Ximenes Filho (born 1945) is a Brazilian actor and voice-over artist.

External links

Brazilian male actors
Living people
1945 births
Date of birth missing (living people)
Brazilian voice actors